The politics of Odisha are part of India's federal parliamentary representative democracy, where the union government exercises sovereign rights. Certain powers are reserved to the states, including Odisha. The state has a multi-party system, in which the two main parties are the nationalist Bharatiya Janata Party (BJP) and the regional, socialist Biju Janata Dal (BJD). The Indian National Congress (INC) has also significant presence.

Present day

The BJD has the largest number of seats in the Odisha Legislative Assembly. Odisha's chief minister is BJD leader Naveen Patnaik, who has led a government since March 2000. Other parties represented in the assembly are the BJP, the Congress Party and the Communist Party of India (Marxist). The next assembly election is scheduled for May 2024.

Odisha is represented by 21 members of the Lok Sabha, the lower house of the Indian parliament. They are elected from geographic constituencies. In the Rajya Sabha (the upper house of parliament), the state is represented by 10 members who are elected by the legislative assembly.

History

Odisha was part of the Bengal Presidency during the British Raj. The presidency was split in 1912, creating Bihar and Orissa Province. In 1936, Orissa Province was created from the Odia-speaking areas of Bihar and Orissa Province and portions of the Vizagapatam Hill Tracts Agency and Ganjam Hill Tracts Agency.

The Government of India Act 1935 provided for the election of a provincial legislative assembly and government, and the head of government was designated as the prime minister. Assembly elections were held in 1937; the Indian National Congress won a majority of the seats, but declined to form a government. A minority provisional government was formed under Krushna Chandra Gajapati, the maharaja of Paralakhemundi. The Congress reversed its decision, and resolved to form a government in July 1937; the governor invited Bishwanath Das to do so. In 1939, with Congress ministers in other provinces, Das resigned in protest of the Governor-General's declaration of war against Germany without consulting Indian leaders. Orissa was under governor's rule until 1941, when Gajapati again became the premier until 1944. Another round of elections was held in 1946 with another Congress majority, and a government was formed under Harekrushna Mahatab.

With Indian independence the position of prime minister was replaced with that of chief minister, and Mahatab became Odisha's first chief minister. Most of the Odia-speaking princely states acceded to India, and were merged with Odisha. In 1951-52, the first elections were held under India's new constitution. Congress won a plurality of seats, but failed to obtain a majority. A coalition government was formed by Nabakrushna Choudhury, with the support of independents.

Parties
The state has a mix of national and regional political parties:
Aam Aadmi Party (AAP) - A regional party in Odisha. In the 2019 general elections, it won 0.6 percent of the votes and no seats.
All India Forward Bloc (AIFB) - A regional party, with West Bengal as its headquarters. In the 2019 Odisha Vidhan Sabha elections, it won 0.4 percent of the vote and no seats.
All India Jharkhand Party - A regional political party based in Jharkhand, with limited support in Odisha. In the 1971 elections, it won four assembly seats.
 All India Trinamool Congress (AITC) - A national party, headed by Mamata Banerjee. In the 2019 Odisha Vidhan Sabha elections, it won 0.7% vote and no seats.
 Biju Janata Dal (BJD) - A regional offshoot of the Janata Dal party, headed by Naveen Patnaik and established in 1997. Leading the state government in successive elections, it won 44.71 percent of the vote and 112 seats in the 2019 elections. The party also won 12 seats in the Lok Sabha elections.
 Bharatiya Janata Party (BJP) - National party, led by Narendra Modi. A coalition partner of the BJD from 1997 to 2009, it has been in opposition in the state assembly since then. In the 2019 Vidhan Sabha election, the party won 32.5 percent of the vote and 23 seats. It also won eight seats in the 2019 Lok Sabha elections.
Bahujan Samaj Party (BSP) - A national party which won 0.82 percent of the vote and no seats in the 2019 Vidhan Sabha elections.
Communist Party of India (CPI) - A national party in a number of states. In the 2019 Vidhan Sabha elections, it won 0.12 percent of the vote and no seats.
Communist Party of India (Marxist) (CPM) - A national party in a number of states, it won 0.3 percent of the vote and one seat in the 2019 Vidhan Sabha elections.
Indian National Congress (INC) - A national party which dominated state politics until 2000; since then, it has been in opposition. In the 2019 Vidhan Sabha elections, the INC won 16.12 percent of the vote and nine seats.
Jharkhand Mukti Morcha (JMM) - A regional party in Jharkhand, influential in some areas of Odisha. Its best performance was in 2004, when it won four assembly seats and one parliamentary seat.
Jharkhand Party (JKP) - Grew from support for a separate Jharkhand state, with limited support in Odisha. In the 1974 assembly elections, it won one seat.

Former political parties are:
 All India Ganatantra Parishad - Also known as the Ganatanra Parishad (GP), it was a regional party based in Odisha which was active from 1950 to 1962. Formed by former rulers of the princely states and large landlords, Rajendra Narayan Singh Deo was its president. In 1962, it merged with the Odisha branch of the Swatantra Party after the parliamentary elections. The party was the principal opposition twice, and was part of the coalition government in 1959.
 Swatantra Party - A classical liberal party, formed by C. Rajagopalachari in 1959. In the 1967 assembly elections, it won a plurality of the vote and formed a coalition government with Rajendra Narayan Singh Deo as chief minister and the Orissa Jana Congress as alliance partner. In subsequent assemblies, Swatantra was in opposition. 
 Orissa Jana Congress - Formed in 1966 by former chief minister Harekrushna Mahatab after he left the Indian National Congress. After the 1967 elections, the Jana Congress participated in a coalition government with the Swatantra Party from 1967 to 1969. In the 1971 and 1974 elections the party won one seat, and merged into the Janata Party in 1977.
Praja Socialist Party (PSP) - A national party formed by a merger of the Socialist Party (led by Jayprakash Narayan) and the Kisan Mazdoor Praja Party, led by J.B. Kripalani. In the 1957 assembly elections, it won 10 percent of the vote and 10 seats. Its best result was the 1967 elections, when it won 12 percent of the vote and 21 seats.
 Janata Party (JNP) - An amalgam of Indian parties opposed to the Emergency. In Odisha, the party formed a government in 1977 with Nilamani Routray as chief minister. The government lasted for two years, and fell when the Janata Party split up.
Janata Dal - A national party formed through the merger of Janata Party factions, the Lokdal, the Indian National Congress (Jagjivan), and the Jan Morcha. In Odisha, the Janata Dal (led by Biju Patnaik) headed the state government from 1990 to 1995 and was the principal opposition from 1995 to 1997.
Utkal Congress (UC) - Formed in 1969, when Biju Patnaik left the Indian National Congress. After the 1971 Odisha elections, UC won 33 seats and 23 percent of the vote. It was a partner in the Bishwanath Das-led coalition government. In 1974, the UC merged into Bharatiya Lok Dal.
Odisha Gana Parishad (OGP)- A splinter group of the Biju Janata Dal, the party was founded on October 29, 2000, and led by Bijoy Mohapatra. In the 2004 elections, the OGP allied with the Indian National Congress. The party had four candidates for the state legislative assembly, two of whom were elected. In 2007, the OGP merged with the Nationalist Congress Party.

Chief ministers

Since independence, Odisha's chief ministers have been:

#= Incumbent number

Elections

Elections to the first Vidhan Sabha (1952–57) of Odisha were held in 1951–52. The Indian National Congress won 67 seats with 37.87 percent of the vote, and Ganatantra Parishad won 31 seats and 20.50 percent of vote. Congress fell short of a simple majority, but formed a government with the support of independents; Nabakrushna Choudhuri was chief minister. The Socialist Party and the Communist Party of India won 10 and 7 seats, respectively, and 24 independents were elected. Nabakrushna Choudhuri resigned after the 1955 flood, and Harekrushna Mahtab returned as chief minister.

Elections to the second Vidhan Sabha (1957–62) were held in 1957. Congress won a plurality with 56 seats, and Ganatantra Parishad won 51 seats; Congress formed a government led by Harekrushna Mahtab.

The most recent election was held in 2019. Biju Janata Dal returned to power with a majority, winning 112 of 147 seats. The BJP won 23 seats (becoming the main opposition), and the INC won nine seats.

References